Avatsara was a Rishi of the Rig Veda. His name first appears in the Fifth Mandala which is older than the Second Mandala.

Background

Avatsara is the main poet of Sukta 44 of the Fifth Mandala of the Rig veda which hymn addressed to the Rigvedic deities, the Visvedevas. He is more known for the set of eight hymns of four mantras each appearing in the Rig Veda viz. Suktas IX.53 to IX.60, and also in the Samaveda (SV.757, SV.1717). He was the Hotr of the gods. He had delighted Agni by the six-syllable oblation – O Agni, enjoy the oblation, and was set-free. According to Satyasadha (21.3.13), the Parvaras of Kashyaps consist of three rishi – ancestors: – Kashyap, Avatsara and Naidhruva. There are eight notable rishis belonging to the Kashyap family – Kashyap, Avatsara, Nidhurva, Rebha, Devala, Asita, Bhutamsa and Vivrha; two unnamed sons of Rebha were also authors of Rigvedic hymns.

As Vedic Rishi

Avatsara was the son of Rishi Kashyap who was later than Rishi Vamadeva (son of Maharishi Gautam) but earlier than Rishi Atri. The word, Avata, denotes an artificially dug up water-source or an artificial well. Avatsara Prasravana, like his father Kashyap, was a Rishi of the Rig Veda. His name first appears in Sukta 44 of the Fifth Mandala.

He is more known for the  Suktas 53 to 60 of the Ninth Mandala; these Suktas contain four mantras each, all composed in the Gayatri Metre. In the Rig Veda, he addresses Ishvara as अद्रिवः, the fully armed and endowed with many subtle and fine divine powers and destroyer of all evil forces (RV.IX.53.1). He then addresses Ishvara as शुक्रम् which means the purifier or the pure, brilliant as the Sun.

His name appears in the Yajurveda, (Y.V.III.i & III.xviii) where he prays to Agni, and in the Aitareya Brahmana and the Kausitaki Brahmana. From the verses of the Aitareya Brahmana (A.B. ii.24) and Kausitaki Brahmana (K.B.viii.6), both pertaining to the Sacrifice of the Five Oblations, it is learnt that Avatsara had reached the home of Agni and had conquered the highest world.

In Rig Veda Sukta IX.53, he reminds us that the learned people extract the wisdom of the ancients from the Vedas which are enlightening, and in Rig Veda mantra IX.60.3 he tells us -
 अति वारन्यवमानो असिष्यद्त्कल्शां अभि धावति |
 इन्द्रस्य हार्द्याविशन् ||
that the Lord, in the form of knowledge and consciousness, resides in the cleansed mind and heart of the learned people and in the mind and heart of all those who know the Lord fully without being aware of knowing Him.

Kashyaps

Apart from Kashyap Marichi there appears to have been a second Kashyap who was the father of Avatsara, Narada and Arundhati, the wife of Rishi Vasistha and it was this second Kashyap who was one of the Sapta Rishis.
And, according to the list of Rishis provided by the Matsya Purana, Kashyap had two sons – Avatsara and Asita; Nidhruva and Rebha were Avatsara’s son. But this list is doubted; the genealogy otherwise gives three groups among the Kashyaps, the Sandliyas, Naidhruvas and Raibhyas. 

From Book IV Chapter VIII of the Srimad Bhagvatam it is learnt though Lord Maitreya that Dhruva, the son of Uttanapada through Suruti, and the grandson of Svyambhuva Manu, had by his first wife Brahmi, two sons, Vatsara and Kalmavatsara or Kalpa.

Gotra

Avatsara is a pravara of Kashyap Gotra and also belonging to the two of the Sandilya variations.

References

Rishis
Gotras